The National Administrative Department of Statistics (DANE) does not collect religious statistics, and accurate reports are difficult to obtain. However, based on various studies and a survey, about 90% of the population adheres to Christianity, the majority of which (70.9%) are Roman Catholic, while a significant minority (16.7%) adhere to Protestantism (primarily Evangelicalism).

Roman Catholic archdioceses and other dioceses (in brackets)
 Barranquilla: (El Banco, Riohacha, Santa Marta, Valledupar)
 Bogotá: (Engativá, Facatativá, Fontibón, Girardot, Soacha, Zipaquirá)
 Bucaramanga: (Barrancabermeja, Málaga-Soatá, Socorro y San Gil, Vélez)
 Cali: (Buenaventura, Buga, Cartago, Palmira)
 Cartagena: (Magangué, Montelibano, Montería, Sincelejo)
 Ibagué: (Espinal, Florencia, Garzón, Líbano-Honda, Neiva)
 Manizales: (Armenia, La Dorada-Guaduas, Pereira)
 Medellín: (Caldas, Girardota, Jericó, Sonsón-Rionegro)
 Nueva Pamplona: (Arauca, Cúcuta, Ocaña, Tibú)
 Popayán: (Ipiales, Mocoa-Sibundoy, Pasto, Tumaco)
 Santa Fe de Antioquia: (Apartadó, Istmina-Tadó, Quibdó, Santa Rosa de Osos)
 Tunja: (Chiquinquirá, Duitama-Sogamoso, Garagoa, Yopal)
 Villavicencio: (Granada en Colombia, San José del Guaviare)

Other Churches
The Episcopal Diocese of Colombia is a part of Province 9 of the Episcopal Church in the United States of America. The Church of Jesus Christ of Latter-day Saints in Colombia claims 209,985 members in Colombia.

Notes

Sources 
Status of religious freedom in Colombia article
Colombia article

See also 
Roman Catholicism in Colombia

 

ar:المسيحية في بنما